Estadio do Clube Desportivo Trofense is a multi-use stadium in Trofa, Portugal. It is currently used mostly for football matches and is the home stadium of C.D. Trofense. The stadium has a seating capacity of 5,074.

The stadium was built on the 24 December 1950. It underwent many renovations during the year 2008, when Clube Desportivo Trofense gained promotion to the Primeira Liga from the Liga de Honra for the first time in their history.

References

External links
 Profile at ForaDeJogo
 Profile at LPFP
 Profile at ZeroZero

Clube Desportivo Trofense
Sports venues in Porto District
Buildings and structures in Trofa
Sports venues completed in 1950